Phloeophila is a genus of orchids belonging to the tribe Pleurothallidinae. While an initial molecular phylogeny in 2013 suggested that the type species of the genus (Phloeophila nummularia) was nested within Pabstiella, further sampling showed that it in fact belongs to a unique clade distant from Pabstiella, forming the current basis of the genus.

Species
Species accepted by the Plants of the World Online as of February 2021:

Phloeophila alphonsiana 
Phloeophila carrilloi 
Phloeophila cunabulum 
Phloeophila cymbula 
Phloeophila dasyglossa 
Phloeophila doucetteana 
Phloeophila nummularia 
Phloeophila pelecaniceps 
Phloeophila peperomioides 
Phloeophila pleurothallopsis 
Phloeophila ursula

References

Pleurothallidinae
Pleurothallidinae genera